Eszter Hollosi is a Budapest, Hungary-born, Vienna, Austria-reared stage and film actress, and director.

She trained with the Royal Shakespeare Company (UK), the Theatre of the Oppressed (Brazil), the Gardzienitze (Poland), the Teatr Piesn Kozla (Poland) and El Instituto del Teatro (Barcelona, Spain). She earned her degree in European Theatre Arts from London's Rose Bruford College.

She made her Austrian stage debut in My Children! My Africa!. She appeared in the Italian short film, Goddess, and the Austrian feature film, Oh Fortuna.

References

Year of birth missing (living people)
Living people
Hungarian film actresses
Hungarian stage actresses
Hungarian emigrants to Austria
Austrian film actresses
Austrian stage actresses
Actresses from Budapest
Actresses from Vienna
Hungarian theatre directors